Transcription factor E2F5 is a protein that in humans is encoded by the E2F5 gene.

Function 

The protein encoded by this gene is a member of the E2F family of transcription factors. The E2F family plays a crucial role in the control of cell cycle and action of tumor suppressor proteins and is also a target of the transforming proteins of small DNA tumor viruses. The E2F proteins contain several evolutionarily conserved domains that are present in most members of the family. These domains include a DNA binding domain, a dimerization domain which determines interaction with the differentiation regulated transcription factor proteins (DP), a transactivation domain enriched in acidic amino acids, and a tumor suppressor protein association domain which is embedded within the transactivation domain. This protein is differentially phosphorylated and is expressed in a wide variety of human tissues. It has higher identity to E2F4 than to other family members. Both this protein and E2F4 interact with tumor suppressor proteins p130 and p107, but not with pRB. Alternative splicing results in multiple variants encoding different isoforms.

Interactions 

E2F5 has been shown to interact with TFDP1.

See also 
 E2F

References

Further reading

External links 
 

Transcription factors